Labdia semiramis is a moth of the family Cosmopterigidae. It is found on the Solomon Islands.

References

Moths described in 1930
Labdia